Margaret of Savoy (7 August 1420 – 30 September 1479), was a daughter of Amadeus VIII of Savoy and Mary of Burgundy. By her three illustrious marriages, she held a number of titles, including Duchess of Anjou, Duchess of Calabria, Countess of Maine, Countess of the Palatinate, and Countess of Württemberg.

Family
Margaret was one of seven children born to Amadeus VIII, Count of Savoy and his wife Mary of Burgundy. A few of her siblings included Louis, Duke of Savoy and Mary, Duchess of Milan.

Her paternal grandparents were Amadeus VII, Count of Savoy and Bonne of Berry. Her maternal grandparents were Philip the Bold, Duke of Burgundy and Margaret III, Countess of Flanders.

Marriages

First
Margaret married firstly Louis, Duke of Anjou, the titular King of Naples. He was a son of Louis II of Anjou and Yolande of Aragon. Their first marriage contract is dated on 31 Mar 1431. She became known as the Duchess of Anjou. They had no children, and he died in 1434.

Second
In 1445, Margaret next married Louis IV, Count Palatine of the Rhine. He was a son of Louis III, Elector Palatine and his second wife Matilda of Savoy. Margaret became Countess of the Palatinate through this alliance. Their marriage lasted only four years, as Louis died on 13 August 1449. They had one son:

 Philip, Elector Palatine (14 July 1448 – 28 February 1508).

Third
Thirdly, she married in Stuttgart 11 November 1453 Ulrich V, Count of Württemberg. They were both the other's third spouses. She added the title Countess of Württemberg to her many titles through this alliance. From this marriage they had the following children:

 Margaret (c. 1454 – 21 April 1470), married 23 April 1469 to Count Philip I of Eppstein-Königstein.
 Philippine (c. 1456 – 4 June 1475, Weert), married 22 April/4 June 1470 to Count James II of Horn.
 Helene (c. 1460 – 19 February 1506), married in Waldenburg 26 February 1476 to Count Kraft VI of Hohenlohe-Neuenstein.

Margaret died on 30 September 1479.

References

Sources

|-

|-

|-

|-

|-

1420 births
1479 deaths
Margaret
Duchesses of Anjou
Countesses of Maine
Countesses of Provence
Remarried royal consorts
Duchesses of Calabria
Margaret
Margaret
People from Morges
Margaret
15th-century German people
15th-century German women
Electresses of the Palatinate